In enzymology, a 4-acetamidobutyryl-CoA deacetylase is an enzyme that catalyzes the chemical reaction

4-acetamidobutanoyl-CoA + H2O  acetate + 4-aminobutanoyl-CoA

Thus, the two substrates of this enzyme are 4-acetamidobutanoyl-CoA and H2O, whereas its two products are acetate and 4-aminobutanoyl-CoA.

This enzyme belongs to the family of hydrolases, those acting on carbon-nitrogen bonds other than peptide bonds, specifically in linear amides.  The systematic name of this enzyme class is 4-acetamidobutanoyl-CoA amidohydrolase. Other names in common use include aminobutyryl-CoA thiolesterase, and deacetylase-thiolesterase.

References

 

EC 3.5.1
Enzymes of unknown structure